The Charros de Jalisco are a professional baseball team in the Mexican Pacific League based in Zapopan, Jalisco. Their home ballpark is Estadio Panamericano, and has a capacity of 16,500 people.

Their initial season was 2014–15. The franchise was originally the Algodoneros de Guasave before it was purchased in April, 2014 by a group of investors led by Armando Navarro, and moved to Jalisco. The team previously played over different stages in the Mexican League, doing so for the last time in 1995.

History
Professional baseball in Guadalajara originated with the Pozoleros de Jalisco, which competed in the now-defunct Central League from 1946 to 1949. From 1952 to 1955, the club competed as the Medias Azules (Blue Socks) in the Liga de la Costa del Pacífico (Pacific Coast League). The team became the Charros in 1949, and competed in both the early Mexican League and the Mexican Pacific League in three stages: 1949 to 1952, 1946 to 1976 and  1991 to 1995.

The second incarnation of the Charros was from 1964 and 1975. This team won Mexican League championships in 1967 and 1971. They played at the Estadio Tecnologico de Béisbol of the University of Guadalajara, which had a capacity of 4,000 spectators.

Origin of the name
The team made a road trip to Chihuahua in its early history. During a stop in a small town, the players bought cowboy hats for protection from the bright sunlight. They were wearing these hats when they arrived at the destination, and were referred to as "charros".

First ballpark
The first home field for the Pozoleros/Charros was the Estadio Municipal in the Analco area, near the Agua Azul park. They played there 1949–52. This ballpark was demolished and replaced by a bus station, which is now a Federal office building.

Mexican League participation 

The Charros competed in the Mexican League for twenty-one seasons, and won two championships.

The first title was in 1967; they defeated the Broncos de Reynosa in the final.

The second title was in 1971, under Manager Benjamín "Cananea" Reyes. They came back from a 0–3 deficit to defeat the Saraperos de Saltillo. Current owner Armando Navarro was Vice-President of the club at the time, and he worked closely with Guillermo Cosío Gaona in the club's management.

During the late stages of the franchise in the late 1980s and 1990s, they did some aggressive hiring, including former Dodgers star Fernando Valenzuela in 1992. However, the increased popularity of soccer and the poor condition of the Estadio Tecnologico led to the team's demise.

Mexican Pacific League participation 

The Charros participated in the Mexican Pacific League in the 1952–53, 1953–54 and 1954–55 seasons. The league was known as the Liga de la Costa del Pacífico at that time.

The Charros returned to the Mexican Pacific League for the 2014–15 season with the acquisition of the Algodoneros de Guasave franchise.

Honours

Mexican Pacific League championships
The Charros have won the Mexican Pacific League Championship once, in the 2018–19 season, when they defeated Yaquis de Ciudad Obregón in six games under manager Roberto Vizcarra.

2022 Caribbean Series roster

Roster

External links 
Official site

References 

  

Charros de Jalisco
Sports teams in Guadalajara, Jalisco
Baseball teams established in 2014
2014 establishments in Mexico
Former Mexican League teams